{{safesubst:#invoke:RfD|||month = March
|day = 20
|year = 2023
|time = 19:21
|timestamp = 20230320192113

|content=
REDIRECT 2022 Conservative Party leadership election

}}